The 1943 Brown Bears football team represented Brown University during the 1943 college football season.

In their third and final season under head coach Jacob N. "Skip" Stahley, the Bears compiled a 5–3 record, and outscored opponents 194 to 180. D.G. Savage Jr. was the team captain.  

Brown played its home games at Brown Stadium on the East Side of Providence, Rhode Island.

Schedule

References

Brown
Brown Bears football seasons
Brown Bears football